The Iron Stove (Der Eisenofen) is a fairy tale collected by the Brothers Grimm, as tale number 127. It is Aarne–Thompson type 425A, the animal bridegroom. Dorothea Viehmann prepared the story for the Grimms' collection.

Synopsis
A prince is cursed by a witch and imprisoned in an iron stove in the woods. A lost princess finds the stove and is surprised to find it talking to her, offering to help her find her way back home, provided she return to the woods with a knife to scrape a hole in the stove, thereby freeing the prince, and marry him.

Her father the King, not wanting to give up his only child to a stove in the woods, tries to send substitutes back to the woods including a miller's daughter and a pig-herd's daughter. Although very beautiful, the women betray their origins, and the princess herself reluctantly returns to the woods. When she scrapes with the knife to make a hole, she sees that the prince is very handsome. He wants to take her to his own country, but she wishes to first bid her father farewell. He agrees, but tells her to speak no more than three words. She fails this prohibition, and can not find the iron stove.

In the woods, she finds a cottage full of toads and frogs. They give her shelter for the night, tell her how to find the prince—by climbing a high glass mountain, and crossing three piercing swords and a great lake—and give her gifts—three large needles, a plough-wheel, and three nuts. She uses the needles to climb the glass mountain and rolls over the swords on the plough-wheel.

She comes upon a castle where the prince is to be married, as he believes her to have died, and takes a job as a maid. One night she cracks nut and finds inside it a dress. She finds that each nut holds a dress and each dress is more beautiful than the last. The prince's bride asks to buy the first dress, but instead the princess offers a trade. In exchange for the dress, she will be allowed to spend one night in the prince's room. That night the bride gives the prince a sleeping drink so that he sleeps through the night and the princess cannot reveal to him who she is. She weeps and the servants overhear. The second night the princess makes the same bargain with the bride but again the bride gives the prince a sleeping drink so that he sleeps through the night. As the princess weeps, the servants again hear. On the third night the princess trades the last dress for a chance to spend the night in the prince's room. Again the bride gives the prince a sleeping drink but this time the servants have told the prince of the princess' sorrowful pleas, and he does not drink. When the princess begins to weep, he reveals that he is awake and knows that she isn't dead and is his true love.

They steal the bride's clothing so she could not get up and flee, using the ploughwheel and the needles to get back to the cottage of toads and frogs, but when they arrive, it becomes a castle, and the frogs and toads, which were the children of kings, are all transformed back into their true forms. They marry and live there for many years, are reconciled with the princess's father and unite their kingdoms into one.

Analysis
In folktales classified as tale type ATU 425A, "The Search for the Lost Husband" or "The Animal as Bridegroom", the maiden breaks a taboo or burns the husband's animal skin and, to atone, she must wear down a numbered pair of metal shoes. On her way to her husband, she usually asks for the help of the Sun, the Moon and the Wind, whereas inother variants, the heroine's helpers are three old women who live in distant cottages. According to Hans-Jörg Uther, the main feature of tale type ATU 425A is "bribing the false bride for three nights with the husband".

Scholar Jack Zipes noted that the tale was "clearly related" to "The Animal Bridegroom" tale type. He also cited that the Brothers Grimm interpreted the Eisenofern as Eitofan, a place of fire and possibly Hell.

Variants
American folklorist Marie Campbell collected an American variant from informant "Aunt" Lizbeth Fields. In this tale, titled The Little Old Rusty Cook Stove in the Woods, a king's daughter loses her way in the woods. Suddenly, she hears a voice coming from inside an old cook stove. The voice from inside the cook stove belongs to a prince. The prince asks for her help in getting him out of the stove, and in exchange he will help her, if she marries him. The king's daughter agrees and finds her way back to her father. She explains the situation to the king, but he disagrees with sending her back to the stove. So he orders a miller's daughter, then a fisherman's daughter in her stead. Each maiden return without releasing the prince. The king's daughter goes herself to the stove and liberates the prince from the stove. She goes back to the castle to say goodbye to her father, but says more than three words and the prince disappears. The king's daughter tries to search for him and finds a hut in the woods, where toad-frogs live. After spending a night there, the toad-frogs give her two needles and a plough-wheel - to use to climb a glass mountain - and three nuts. The king's daughter climbs the glass mountain and hires herself as a cook in a castle. The king's daughter discovers the "stove prince" is living there and is soon to be married to another wife. The king's daughter cracks opens the nuts to produce dresses she uses to bribe the false bride for three nights with the stove prince.

In popular culture
The Iron Stove is featured in Grimm's Fairy Tale Classics, but it has many changes. The prince's bride does not exist and is instead replaced by a creature known as the imp fairy (who resembles a succubus), and she takes place as the princess' love rival for him. The prince is put in a trance rather than to sleep, and the princess breaks said trance by going through a thorny mountain, crossing a lake without a boat, tricking guards with a nut that contains diamonds, refusing to believe that the prince would choose the fairy over him even when the fairy taunts her about it, and finally by openly telling him that she loves him. When the prince is disenchanted, she jumps off from a huge flight of stairs towards him; her love for him creates protective shields that let her reach him, and then deflect the fairy’s magical powers and cause her to fall through the ground into a bottomless abyss.

See also

 Black Bull of Norroway
 East of the Sun and West of the Moon
 The Brown Bear of Norway
 The Singing, Springing Lark

References

External links
 Full text of The Iron Stove from The Fairy Book

Iron Stove
Iron Stove
ATU 400-459